Chauncey William Reed (June 2, 1890 – February 9, 1956) was a U.S. Representative from Illinois.

Reed was born in West Chicago, Illinois to William Thomas Reed and Margaret Reed. Reed's father held several political positions.

Reed attended the local public schools and Northwestern University in  Evanston, Illinois.

Reed was city treasurer of West Chicago, Illinois, in 1913 and 1914.
He graduated from the Webster College of Law in Chicago, Illinois, in 1915.
He was admitted to the bar that same year and commenced practice in Naperville, Illinois.

During World War I, Reed served as a sergeant in the 86th Infantry Division.
He resumed his law practice in Naperville upon his return from the war. 
Reed served as State's Attorney of DuPage County from 1920 to 1935 and also served as chairman of the DuPage County Republican Central Committee from 1926 to 1934. On October 3, 1929, Reed married Ella D. Stegen. They would become the parents of three children.

Reed was elected as a Republican to the 74th United States Congress in 1934 and was later reelected to the ten succeeding Congresses, and served from January 3, 1935, until his death in Bethesda, Maryland on February 9, 1956.
He served as chairman of the Committee on the Judiciary for the 83rd Congress.
Reed was interred in Glen Oak Cemetery in his hometown of West Chicago, Illinois.

See also
 List of United States Congress members who died in office (1950–99)

References

External links

 

1890 births
1956 deaths
People from West Chicago, Illinois
Politicians from Naperville, Illinois
United States Army soldiers
Republican Party members of the United States House of Representatives from Illinois
20th-century American politicians